Pentila phidia, the Ghana pentila, is a butterfly in the family Lycaenidae. It is found in central and eastern Ivory Coast, Ghana and Togo. The habitat consists of forests.

References

Butterflies described in 1874
Poritiinae
Butterflies of Africa
Taxa named by William Chapman Hewitson